The Town of Clayton is located in Polk County, Wisconsin, United States. The population was 571 at the 2000 census. The Village of Clayton and the unincorporated communities of Joel and Richardson are located in the town.

History
The village of Clayton was first settled by logging families in the 1870s. In 1874, the railroad arrived, connecting logging camps within the area. The railroad ended  near Lake Camelia at a sawmill owned by Humbird and Rogers. The village was named after Clayton Rogers, the boss of the sawmill, for his service during the Civil War.
The village is located within the town.

Scandinavian, German, and Russian families who settled here turned to dairy farming. The many small creameries and cheese factories that sprang up in the area were purchased by Stella Cheese Company in the 1930s. During the 1960s, the Stella factory became the largest producer of blue cheese in the world. The Clayton Lions Club called Clayton “The Blue Cheese Capital of the World” to promote the town. To this day, the town celebrates Cheese Days on Father’s Day weekend in June. The Wisconsin Dairies Cooperative bought the cheese factory in the 1980s. Today, it is known as Foremost Farms and produces pizza cheese.

Geography
According to the United States Census Bureau, the town has a total area of 33.8 square miles (87.6 km2), of which, 33.2 square miles (86.1 km2) of it is land and 0.6 square miles (1.6 km2) of it (1.80%) is water.

Demographics

As of the census of 2010, there were 571 people, 360 households, and 263 families residing in the town. The population density was 27.4 people per square mile (10.6/km2). There were 412 housing units at an average density of 12.4 per square mile (4.8/km2). The racial makeup of the town was 95.97% White, 0% Native American, 0% Asian, and 1.93% from two or more races.  2.1% of the population were Hispanic or Latino of any race.

There were 360 households, out of which 32.8% had children under the age of 18 living with them, 62.8% were married couples living together, 4.7% had a female householder with no husband present, and 26.9% were non-families. 23.3% of all households were made up of individuals, and 7.5% had someone living alone who was 65 years of age or older. The average household size was 2.53 and the average family size was 2.94.

In the town, the population was spread out, with 26.1% under the age of 18, 5.5% from 18 to 24, 27.3% from 25 to 44, 28.8% from 45 to 64, and 12.3% who were 65 years of age or older. The median age was 39 years. For every 100 females, there were 113.6 males. For every 100 females age 18 and over, there were 116.0 males.

The median income for a household in the town was $41,719, and the median income for a family was $47,031. Males had a median income of $27,891 versus $22,656 for females. The per capita income for the town was $17,985. About 4.6% of families and 8.5% of the population were below the poverty line, including 11.0% of those under age 18 and 10.9% of those age 65 or over.

References

External links
Official Website
School District Website

Towns in Polk County, Wisconsin
Towns in Wisconsin